Puthenveedu is a 1971 Indian Malayalam film, directed by K. Sukumaran Nair. The film stars Prem Nazir, Sheela, Jayabharathi and T. R. Omana in the lead roles. The film had musical score by M. S. Baburaj.

Cast
Prem Nazir
Sheela
Jayabharathi
T. R. Omana
T. S. Muthaiah
Adoor Bhavani
Bahadoor
Kottarakkara Sreedharan Nair
S. P. Pillai
Veeran

Soundtrack
The music was composed by M. S. Baburaj and the lyrics were written by Vayalar Ramavarma.

References

External links
 

1971 films
1970s Malayalam-language films